These are the official results of the Women's Discus Throw event at the 1999 World Championships in Seville, Spain. There were a total number of 31 participating athletes, with the final held on Monday 23 August 1999.

Medalists

Schedule
All times are Central European Time (UTC+1)

Abbreviations
All results shown are in metres

Qualification
 Held on Saturday 21 August 1999 with the mark set at 63.50 metres

Final

References
 
trackandfieldnews
 Results
 Results-Discus Throw

D
Discus throw at the World Athletics Championships
1999 in women's athletics